Hakea flabellifolia, commonly known as the fan-leaved hakea or wedge hakea, is a shrub in the family  Proteacea. It is endemic   to an area along the west coast in the Mid West and Wheatbelt regions of Western Australia.

Description
A multi-stemmed species with slender upright branchlets. It blooms from October to November and produces green-red-brown strongly scented flowers in the leaf axils and along old wood.

Taxonomy and naming
Hakea flabellifolia was first formally described in 1855 by Swiss botanist Carl Meisner and the description was published in Hooker's Journal of Botany and Kew Garden Miscellany. It is named from the Latin flabellum-small fan and folium-a leaf, referring to the fan shaped appearance of the leaves.

Distribution and habitat
This species grows on sand, loam, and lateritic gravel in heathland from the northern sand plains at Eneabba and south to Dandaragan. It requires an open sunny aspect with good drainage.

Conservation status
Hakea flabellifolia is classified as "not threatened" by the Western Australian Government Department of Parks and Wildlife.

References

flabellifolia
Eudicots of Western Australia
Plants described in 1855